Gulyukovo (Gölök) is a rural locality (a village) in Starobaishevsky Selsoviet, Dyurtyulinsky District, Bashkortostan, Russia. The population was 181 as of 2010. There is 1 street.

Geography 
Gulyukovo is located 22 km southeast of Dyurtyuli (the district's administrative centre) by road. Starourtayevo is the nearest rural locality.

References 

Rural localities in Dyurtyulinsky District